Engage Mutual Assurance (Homeowners Friendly Society Limited) was a financial products provider based in Harrogate, North Yorkshire. It operated as a mutual friendly society with no shareholders, and was owned by its 500,000 members.

In 2015, Engage Mutual merged with Family Investments to become OneFamily, moving its headquarters to Brighton, East Sussex.

Products and services
Engage Mutual provided a range of products, with a major emphasis on healthcare. Primary products included over-50s life insurance, health cash plans, tax-exempt savings plans and insurance bonds. It also provided new Child Trust Fund accounts until they were discontinued by the British government in 2011, and replaced with Junior ISAs.

Acquisitions and partnerships
During its 35-year history, Engage Mutual expanded through the acquisition of competitors. In 2010, it bought not-for-profit healthcare provider Provincial Hospital Services Association (PHSA), and part of long-term insurance business Ecclesiastical Life Limited.

It also engineered partnerships with Clydesdale Bank, and its subsidiary Yorkshire Bank, to promote its life cover and tax-exempt savings products, and offered funeral funding options in partnership with The Co-operative Funeralcare.

Merger
In 2014, after gaining the backing of 95% of its members, Engage Mutual announced that it would be merging with Brighton-based Family Investments to create OneFamily, which began trading under its new name from April 1, 2015. Due to the larger operation at the Family Investments headquarters, the business was gradually moved to Brighton, with a full transition scheduled for completion by 2017.

Sponsorship
Engage Mutual was the title sponsor of Super League, England's top-level rugby league club championship, from 2005 to 2011, taking over from Tetley's Brewery in a deal worth £1.65 million.

It also supported a number of charitable initiatives connected with rugby league, including the RFL Benevolent Fund (also known as Try Assist), which supports those injured while playing the sport.

Locally, Engage Mutual also had an association with Saint Michael’s Hospice in Harrogate.

See also
 Super League
 English rugby league sponsorship

References

External links
 OneFamily website

Companies based in Harrogate
Friendly societies of the United Kingdom
Financial services companies established in 1980
Financial services companies disestablished in 2015